is a Japanese manga artist. He studied technical design while still at Kyushu Sangyo University, where he began to draw manga. He worked on several one-shot stories before releasing his serialized works: Cat's Eye, City Hunter and Angel Heart.

After the success of Cat's Eye and City Hunter, Hojo went on to work on other series such as Family Compo. His current ongoing series is Angel Heart, a spin–off of City Hunter set in an alternate universe. It has been serialized in the Weekly Comic Bunch since 2001 and 30 collected volumes have been published so far.

Tsukasa Hojo is Takehiko Inoue's mentor. Inoue worked as an assistant to Hojo during the production of City Hunter. Hojo is also a long-time acquaintance of Fist of the North Star illustrator Tetsuo Hara, who was also one of the founders of Coamix. Hojo contributed to the production Fist of the North Star: The Legends of the True Savior film series by designing the character of Reina.

He was honor guest of the eleventh French Japan Expo which was held in July 2010. Hojo will be the Manga Guest of Honor at the Japan Expo 2023.

Works

References

External links
  

 
 Tsukasa Hojo manga  at Media Arts Database 

 
1959 births
Living people
People from Kitakyushu
Manga artists from Fukuoka Prefecture